Schuit may refer to: 

 A schuyt, the archaic spelling of schuit
 A Trekschuit
 Schuit., taxonomic author abbreviation of André Schuiteman (born 1960), Dutch botanist